The Country Lovers is a 1911 American short silent comedy film directed by Mack Sennett and starring Blanche Sweet.

Cast
 Blanche Sweet
 Charles West
 Grace Henderson
 Mack Sennett

See also
 List of American films of 1911
 Blanche Sweet filmography

References

External links

1911 films
1911 comedy films
1911 short films
Silent American comedy films
American silent short films
American black-and-white films
Films directed by Mack Sennett
American comedy short films
Films with screenplays by Frank E. Woods
1910s American films
1910s English-language films